Muldava Glacier is the 4.4 km long and 3.2 km wide glacier on Magnier Peninsula, Graham Coast on the west side of Antarctic Peninsula, situated west of Luke Glacier and northeast of Nesla Glacier.  It drains the northwest slopes of Lisiya Ridge north of Mount Perchot, and flows northwards into Leroux Bay.

The glacier is named after the settlement of Muldava in Southern Bulgaria.

Location
British mapping in 1971.

Maps
 British Antarctic Territory.  Scale 1:200000 topographic map. DOS 610 Series, Sheet W 65 64.  Directorate of Overseas Surveys, Tolworth, UK, 1971.
 Antarctic Digital Database (ADD). Scale 1:250000 topographic map of Antarctica. Scientific Committee on Antarctic Research (SCAR), 1993–2016.

References
 Bulgarian Antarctic Gazetteer. Antarctic Place-names Commission. (details in Bulgarian, basic data in English)
 Muldava Glacier. SCAR Composite Gazetteer of Antarctica

External links
 Muldava Glacier. Copernix satellite image

Bulgaria and the Antarctic
Glaciers of Graham Coast